Guarisco is an Italian surname. Notable people with the surname include:

Anthony Guarisco Jr. (born 1938), American politician, lawyer, and real estate businessman
Elio Guarisco (born 1954), Italian writer, translator, and Tibetan Buddhist scholar

Italian-language surnames